Céilí dances or true éilí dances (fíor céilí) are a popular form of folk dancing in Ireland. Céilí dances are based on heys ("hedges", pairs of lines facing), round dances, long dances, and quadrilles, generally revived during the Gaelic revival in the first quarter of the twentieth century 
and codified by the Irish Dancing Commission. These thirty dances form the basis for examination of céilí dance teachers. Irish céilí is a participatory social event attended by both men and women and accompanied by live Irish traditional music.

The dance emerged within cultural nationalist consciousness as during the 19th and early 20th century, traditions promoting nationalist agendas were promoted and national identities were regarded as not culturally unified.

Irish céilí regained its popularity in the 19th century, when Ireland took effort to regain its cultural and political autonomy after being colonized for 800 years. The goal of the Gaelic League established in 1893 was to promote Irish cultural independence and de-anglicisation, which involved the popularization of Irish language, literature, and vernacular traditions, such as Irish singing and dancing. Plentiful branches of the Gaelic League giving dance, singing, music, and literature classes were established across Ireland.

Dance form and style

The style of dance employed for ceili dance differs greatly from that used for set dance, and has more the appearance associated with the style of step dance. In particular, it emphasizes height and extension, with dancers generally dancing on their toes (but not "en pointe" as in ballet).
A movement called "side-step" or "sevens and threes" with which dancers travel sideways to the direction they are facing is common, as are jig-step movements called the "rising step" or "grinding step". Ceili dances may be divided into figures, but a single type of tune is generally used for all the figures and the dancing does not pause between the figures.

Unlike square dance and round dance, ceili dances are generally not called by a caller: the flow of dance is defined by its name.

Social Ceili dances 

Ceili dances when performed socially are often performed in a progressive style.  At the end of one whole iteration of the dance (lead around and body), instead of stopping, the groups move on to the next set of partners in the line.  Ceili dances that can be performed progressively are: Walls of Limerick, Siege of Ennis, Haymaker's Jig, Fairy Reel.  When there is a large social gathering, there will often be a caller for the dance, though it is a very different style from square dancing caller.  A ceili caller is usually the teacher or most experienced dancer of the group who has the dance memorized.  They then call the movements out in a non-stylized way, intended to remind those who are non-dancers when and where to move.  Social ceili dances are often the easiest dances and very easy to shuffle through as a non-dancer.  A caller makes sure that everyone at a social dance can participate.  Embellishments are accepted and fun in social ceili dances, women adding spins or changing the style of a swing based on the skill of a partner.

Competitive Ceili dance 

At festival, there are also ceili dance competitions.  Typically competitions are 8-hand dances, though any "Four-hand" ceili dance may be used.  Ceili dances are judged by not only their skill at performing the movements, but adherence to the listed book description of the dance and uniformity of movement of all members of the team.  Embellishments of ceili dances are strictly forbidden in competition.  A competition dance consists of the body and one figure (performed by the first top couple).  Ceili competitions are part of most step-dancing competitions as well, with many dancers performing in both.  Some dancers who may not have the skill for solo step-dancing excel at the conformity and precision needed for ceili competitions.

See also 
 Irish dance

Notes
Notes

Sources

External links
 A Handbook of Irish Dances, 1. Edition (1902) O'Keeffe & O'Brien
 Ceili dance notes

European folk dances
Irish dance
Irish folk music